The men's singles soft tennis event was part of the soft tennis programme and took place between December 5 and 6, at the Khalifa International Tennis and Squash Complex.

Schedule
All times are Arabia Standard Time (UTC+03:00)

Results

Group round

Group A

Group B

Group C

Group D

Group E

Group F

Final round

References 

Official website

External links 
soft-tennis.org

Soft tennis at the 2006 Asian Games